Princess Alice, Duchess of Gloucester,  (born Lady Alice Christabel Montagu Douglas Scott; 25 December 1901 – 29 October 2004) was the wife of Prince Henry, Duke of Gloucester, the third son of King George V and Queen Mary. She was the mother of Prince William of Gloucester and Prince Richard, Duke of Gloucester.

The daughter of the 7th Duke of Buccleuch, Scotland's largest landowner, she became by marriage a princess of the United Kingdom, and a sister-in-law to Edward VIII and George VI. She was thus an aunt by marriage to Elizabeth II. Princess Alice was extremely well travelled, both before and after her marriage. At the time of her death at age 102, she was the longest-lived member of the British royal family.

Early life
Alice Christabel was born in Montagu House, Whitehall, London, on Christmas Day 1901 as the third daughter and fifth child of John Montagu Douglas Scott, Earl of Dalkeith (later Duke of Buccleuch and Queensberry), and his wife, the former Lady Margaret Alice "Molly" Bridgeman, daughter of the 4th Earl of Bradford. Her brothers Walter and William and her nephew John were all Conservative MPs. Her first cousin, Marian Louisa, Lady Elmhirst, was the paternal grandmother of Sarah, Duchess of York, former wife of Alice's great-nephew, Prince Andrew, Duke of York.

She was a descendant, in an unbroken male line, of Charles II through his eldest but illegitimate son, James Scott, 1st Duke of Monmouth, himself a major political figure during the years leading up to the Glorious Revolution. As she was born on Christmas Day, she was given the middle name of Christabel.

Alice spent much of her childhood travelling "between splendid houses": Boughton House in Northamptonshire, Drumlanrig Castle in Dumfries and Galloway, and Bowhill in the Scottish Borders. Eildon Hall, in Melrose, Scottish Borders, was more or less home base.

An experience of nearly drowning at the age of 14 awoke her to a keen sense of making the most of every day. Caught in a current in the Solway Firth, she was convinced that she was going to die and she prayed to God, begging for a miracle to save her life in exchange for her devoting herself to public service:

She attended the independent St James's School for Girls, in West Malvern, Worcestershire, and later travelled to France, Kenya and India. After school in West Malvern, she spent a year in Paris "before returning home to be presented at Court in 1920". Alice enjoyed skiing, horse-riding and hunting and was also an accomplished watercolourist. A painting by her, done near Archers Post in Kenya, is today part of the Royal Collection. In Kenya, where she stayed for over a year, from about 1929–1931, she stayed in the area typical of the so-called Happy Valley set and encountered many of the personalities of said clique, including Evelyn Waugh.

Marriage

In 1935, Alice returned to the United Kingdom when she learned that her father's health had been deteriorating. In August 1935, Lady Alice became engaged to Prince Henry, Duke of Gloucester. They were married in a private ceremony, in the Private Chapel, Buckingham Palace, on 6 November of that year. A much more elaborate wedding was originally planned for Westminster Abbey; but after the Duke of Buccleuch died of cancer on 19 October 1935, and in consideration of the King's own failing health, it was decided that the wedding should be scaled down to a more private setting.

The Duchess's bridesmaids were her sister, the Lady Angela Montagu-Douglas-Scott; her nieces Clare Phipps, Lady Elizabeth Montagu-Douglas-Scott, and Anne Hawkins; her husband's nieces Princess Elizabeth and Princess Margaret of York; her cousin Moyra Montagu-Douglas-Scott; and her husband's cousin Lady Mary Cambridge. Alice wore a blush-hued wedding gown, the only British royal bride to do so. Her gown was designed by Norman Hartnell, who later designed the wedding dress of Princess Elizabeth, the future queen. The dress was "of modest simplicity, with long, narrow sleeves and a high neckline draped into a nosegay of artificial orange-blossom". The veil was made from "a drifting cloud of crisp modern tulle".

On her way to the private chapel at Buckingham Palace, Alice wore "an ermine blanket stole" due to the cold weather. Although the day was cold and wet, a crowd estimated to be over one million people lined the streets from the Palace to the railway station to see the couple off on their honeymoon. She was often referred to as the "Winter Princess" from then on.

Life in the royal family

Initially the Duke and Duchess of Gloucester lived at the Royal Pavilion in Aldershot, where the Duke was taking the Army staff course. The Duke of Gloucester left the army to take on more public duties following the abdication of Edward VIII in December 1936.

The couple received a grace and favour residence at York House, St James's Palace, London, and, in 1938, they purchased Barnwell Manor in Northamptonshire. The Duchess suffered two miscarriages, before giving birth to two sons:

 Prince William of Gloucester (18 December 1941 – 28 August 1972)
 Prince Richard, Duke of Gloucester (born 26 August 1944). He married a Danish commoner, Birgitte van Deurs Henriksen, on 8 July 1972. The couple later had three children.

The Duke and Duchess of Gloucester travelled extensively, undertaking various engagements. The public appearances of the Duchess included launching  on 19 October 1937. During World War II, the Duchess worked with the Red Cross and the Order of St John. She became head of the Women's Auxiliary Air Force (WAAF) in 1939 as Senior Controller, changed to Air Commandant on 12 March 1940, and appointed Air Chief Commandant on 4 March 1943, when she took over as director until August 1944. When the WAAF became the Women's Royal Air Force (WRAF) in 1949, she was appointed an Air Chief Commandant (equivalent to Air vice-marshal) in the new service on 1 February 1949. She was promoted to Air marshal on 1 September 1968, and to air chief marshal in the Royal Air Force on 23 February 1990. She also served as deputy to Queen Elizabeth, the consort of George VI, as Commandant-in-Chief of the Nursing Corps.

From 1945 to 1947, the Duke and Duchess of Gloucester lived in Canberra, where the Duke was serving as Governor-General of Australia.

The Duchess of Gloucester served as Colonel-in-Chief or deputy Colonel-in-Chief of a dozen regiments in the British Army, including the King's Own Scottish Borderers, the Northamptonshire Regiment, the 2nd East Anglian Regiment (Duchess of Gloucester's Own Royal Lincolnshire and Northamptonshire), the Royal Anglian Regiment, the Royal Hussars, and the Royal Irish Rangers (27th Inniskilling); also, the Royal Corps of Transport. She was Patron of the Girls' Day School Trust and Queen Margaret College.

In 1965, while returning from Winston Churchill's funeral in their vehicle, the Duke suffered a stroke which resulted in a car crash, with the Duke being thrown out of the car and the Duchess "suffering facial injuries". On the occasion she wrote "I was sitting beside him to grab the wheel or put my foot on the brake if he fell asleep and lost control, but on that occasion I must have dozed off myself. Apparently the Rolls swerved off the road (and) ended upside down in a field of cabbages. Prince Henry had luckily been thrown through the open door...into (stinging) nettles and brambles".

In 1972, the Duchess's elder son, Prince William, was killed in a plane crash while participating in an amateur air show race. Her husband was in such poor health at the time of their son's death that the Duchess hesitated whether to tell him, later admitting in her memoirs that she did not but that he may have learned of William's death from television coverage. The Duke of Gloucester died on 10 June 1974 at the age of 74.

Later life
In 1975, Princess Alice was the first woman to be appointed a Dame Grand Cross of the Order of the Bath. In 1981, she first published her memoirs under the title The Memoirs of Princess Alice, Duchess of Gloucester. In 1991, she released a revised edition as Memories of Ninety Years.

In 1994, after the Gloucesters had to give up Barnwell Manor for financial reasons, Alice moved from Barnwell to Kensington Palace, where she lived with the current Duke and Duchess of Gloucester. She officially retired from public duties at the age of 98. In 1999, the Duke issued a press release announcing that due to physical frailty, his mother would no longer carry out public engagements outside the environs of Kensington Palace. In July 2000, the Duke said in another statement that his mother had become "increasingly forgetful."

In December 2001, the royal family held a ceremony to acknowledge Princess Alice's 100th birthday. This was Princess Alice's last public appearance (as well as the last public appearance of Princess Margaret, the Queen's younger sister, who died on 9 February 2002). On the death of Queen Elizabeth The Queen Mother at age 101 in March 2002, Princess Alice became the oldest living member of the British royal family. On 21 August 2003, Princess Alice surpassed the Queen Mother's record as the oldest person in the history of the British royal family by reaching the age of 101 years and 238 days. On 20 September 2003, at the age of 101 years and 269 days, she was certified by Guinness World Records as the world's longest-lived royal of all time, surpassing Leonilla, Princess of Sayn-Wittgenstein-Sayn.

Death
Princess Alice died on 29 October 2004 in her sleep at Kensington Palace, at the age of 102 years and 309 days. Following her death, the Union Jack flew at half mast at Buckingham Palace. Her funeral was held on 5 November 2004, at St George's Chapel, Windsor, and she was interred next to her husband, Prince Henry, and her elder son, Prince William, in the Royal Burial Ground at Frogmore. The funeral was attended by Elizabeth II and other members of the British royal family. A memorial service was held at St Clement Danes on 2 February 2005, which was attended by her son and his family and representatives of organisations Princess Alice was involved in; the service was co-ordinated by the Royal Air Force in respect of Princess Alice's role as Commandant-in-Chief WRAF.

Legacy
Hugo Vickers called Princess Alice "a very private person who was not widely known to the general public" despite being the third-highest-ranking lady in the royal family at the time of her marriage. 
It was well known she disliked large parties. Peter Townsend said of her: "She possessed classic, serene good looks and sincerity shone from her mild face. But she was painfully shy, so that conversation with her was sometimes halting and unrewarding, for you felt that she had so much more to say, but could not bring herself to say it." Alice herself wrote in her autobiography: "I was very shy and rather plump, ... I made a miserable debut at a dance at Windsor for Princess Mary's birthday, uncomfortably squeezed into a white satin frock."

Although generally a woman of few and soft-spoken words, Princess Alice was known for her dry humour. Soon after her marriage, when the couple moved to York House, they were warned that the drawing-room floor would not stand the weight of more than twenty people. "So we made a party list", recalled the Duchess many years later, "of the twenty-one people whom we disliked most".
The Queen Mother said of Princess Alice after her son's death in an aircrash in 1972: "The tragic accident was a great shock to all the family, but I feel desperately for his dear little mother. She has the courage of a lion, and has suffered so many cruel blows in the past few years...". Alice herself later admitted that following her son's death "I was completely stunned and have never quite been the same since."

Titles, styles, honours and arms

Titles and styles
25 December 1901 – 5 November 1935: Lady Alice Montagu Douglas Scott
6 November 1935 – 10 June 1974: Her Royal Highness The Duchess of Gloucester
10 June 1974 – 29 October 2004: Her Royal Highness Princess Alice, Duchess of Gloucester

On 10 June 1974, Prince Henry died, and was succeeded as Duke of Gloucester by their second son, Prince Richard (the couple's elder son, Prince William, had been killed in an aeroplane crash in 1972). As a widow, she requested permission from her niece, the Queen, to use the title and style HRH Princess Alice, Duchess of Gloucester instead of adopting HRH The Dowager Duchess of Gloucester. This form of title is normally only afforded to a Princess of the Blood. The Queen allowed her aunt to adopt this title, in part to avoid confusion with her daughter-in-law, the new Duchess of Gloucester (formerly Birgitte van Deurs Henriksen).

Honours

British honours
GCStJ: Dame Grand Cross of the Order of St. John, 22 December 1936
CI: Companion of the Crown of India, 9 June 1937
GBE: Dame Grand Cross of the Order of the British Empire, 11 May 1937 
GCVO: Dame Grand Cross of the Royal Victorian Order, 1 January 1948
GCB: Dame Grand Cross of the Order of the Bath, 2 April 1975
Royal Family Order of King George V, 1935
Royal Family Order of King George VI, 1937
Royal Family Order of Queen Elizabeth II, 1952

Foreign honours
 Grand Cross of the Order of the Crown, 1938
 Grand Cordon of the Order of the Virtues (Nishan al-Kamal), 1950
 Grand Cross of the Order of the Queen of Sheba, 1958

Military appointments
UK
 Colonel-in-Chief, the King's Own Scottish Borderers
 Colonel-in-Chief, the Northamptonshire Regiment
 Colonel-in-Chief, the 2nd East Anglian Regiment (Duchess of Gloucester's Own Royal Lincolnshire and Northamptonshire)
 Colonel-in-Chief, the Royal Hussars (until 1992)
 Colonel-in-Chief, the Royal Irish Rangers (27th Inniskilling) (until 1989)
 Colonel-in-Chief, the Royal Corps of Transport
 Deputy Colonel-in-Chief, the Royal Anglian Regiment
 Deputy Colonel-in-Chief, the King's Royal Hussars
 Deputy Commandant-in-Chief, the Nursing Corps
 Lady Sponsor, 

Commonwealth
 Colonel-in-Chief, Australian Women's Army Service
 Colonel-in-Chief, Royal Australian Corps of Transport
 Colonel-in-Chief, Royal New Zealand Army Service Corps (until 1979)
 Colonel-in-Chief, Royal New Zealand Corps of Transport
 Honorary Colonel, Australian Army Nursing Service Reserve (until 1947)
 Commandant-in-Chief, Women's Royal Australian Naval Service (until 1947)
 Commandant-in-Chief, Women's Auxiliary Australian Air Force (until 1947)
 Commandant-in-Chief, Australian Women's Land Army

Military ranks
 1939: Head and Senior Controller, the Women's Auxiliary Air Force (WAAF)
 1940: Air Commandant, the Women's Auxiliary Air Force
 1943: Air Chief Commandant, the Women's Auxiliary Air Force
 1949: Air Chief Commandant (equivalent to Air Vice-Marshal), the Women's Royal Air Force (WRAF)
 1968: Air Marshal, the Women's Royal Air Force
 1990: Air Chief Marshal, the Royal Air Force

Ancestry

Publications
Princess Alice, Duchess of Gloucester, The Memoirs of Princess Alice, Duchess of Gloucester (London: Collins, 1983), .
Princess Alice, Duchess of Gloucester, Memories of Ninety Years (London: Collins & Brown Ltd, 1991), .

References

Bibliography

Ronald Allison and Sarah Riddell, eds., The Royal Encyclopedia (London: Macmillan, 1991), .
Marlene A. Eilers, Queen Victoria's Descendants (New York: Atlantic International Publishing, 1987), .

External links

Princess Alice, Duchess of Gloucester Official website of the British monarchy (archived)
Regiments.org listing

1901 births
2004 deaths
20th-century memoirists
British centenarians
Gloucester
British royal memoirists
Burials at the Royal Burial Ground, Frogmore
Alice
Alice, Duchess of Gloucester, Princess
Alice, Duchess of Gloucester, Princess
Alice, Duchess of Gloucester, Princess
Alice, Duchess of Gloucester, Princess
Alice, Duchess of Gloucester, Princess
Daughters of British dukes
Double dames
English Anglicans
English centenarians
Female air force generals and air marshals
House of Windsor
People educated at Malvern St James
People from Westminster
Alice, Duchess of Gloucester, Princess
Royal Air Force air marshals of World War II
Spouses of Australian Governors-General
Alice, Duchess of Gloucester, Princess
Wives of knights
Women in the Royal Air Force
Women centenarians
Women's Auxiliary Air Force officers
Women's Royal Air Force officers
Recipients of orders, decorations, and medals of Ethiopia